The Northern Ireland Intermediate League is an amateur intermediate league based in the north-west region of Northern Ireland. As one of the leagues in the 4th tier of Northern Irish football, the league champions can be promoted to the NIFL Premier Intermediate League, providing they meet the admittance requirements.

Clubs in membership (2019–20) 
 Ardstraw
 Dungiven Celtic
 Maiden City
 Newbuildings United
 Newtowne
 Strabane Athletic
 Trojans

Cup competitions 
Intermediate Challenge Cup
Intermediate League Cup

List of champions

Summary of winners

Sources
Malcolm Brodie (ed.), Northern Ireland Soccer Yearbooks 1979/80 to 2008/09.

External links 
 Northern Ireland Intermediate League Archive at the Irish Football Club Project
 nifootball.co.uk - (For fixtures, results and tables of all Northern Ireland amateur football leagues)

4
Fourth level football leagues in Europe